Frankie Emerson, also known as Frankie Teardrop, is an American indie multi-instrumentalist, best known as a current member and for his work with the neo-psychedelic rock band, The Brian Jonestown Massacre.

The Brian Jonestown Massacre

Emerson joined The BJM in March, 2000, and is notable for his twelve-string guitar and various other contributions, playing lead guitar on the song "When Jokers Attack", among others, and co-writing "You Have Been Disconnected".

Spindrift
Emerson is a multi-instrumentalist (guitar, keyboards, percussion) and original member of the music line-up of the neo-psychedelic rock band, Spindrift.

Other projects
Emerson has also contributed to other American rock bands; The Situation and playing bass for neo-psychedelic rock band, The Cold War Direction.

External links
 Brian Jonestown Massacre
 The Situation's homepage

References

Living people
1972 births
The Brian Jonestown Massacre members
Guitarists from Los Angeles
American male guitarists
21st-century American guitarists
21st-century American male musicians